Chef Boy Logro Kusina Master: Sikreto ng Experto ( Boy Logro Kitchen Master: Secret of the Expert) is a Philippine television cooking show broadcast by GMA Network. Hosted by Boy Logro, it premiered on January 2, 2012 on the network's morning line up. The show concluded on May 9, 2014 with a total of 618 episodes. It was replaced by Basta Every Day Happy in its timeslot.

Overview

Chef Boy Logro: Kusina Master is a 30-minute cooking show that features a step-by-step cooking guide and unfold excellent kitchen skills and unravel secrets to make cooking and food preparation effortless and fun. Every week, there will be a celebrity guest co-host that will assist Chef Boy in preparing different dishes. At the end of every episode, Chef Boy will give an assignment to viewers on what they need to buy or prepare for next episode.

Because of the success in ratings game, Chef Boy Logro: Kusina Master extended time from 15 minutes to 30 minutes on its second season. It also added a new segment named "Master Express" where Chef Boy is challenged to make a dish as fast as five minutes. Later, on July 9, 2012, as the show celebrated its 3rd season and its success in ratings game, GMA Network announced the extension of its airtime, from 30 minutes to 45 minutes.

On its third season, the show presented another segment called "Turo Tours" wherein the show went around Metro Manila and some provinces with a six-wheeler mobile kitchen-studio. The said segment aims to bring the show closer to its audience by giving them a chance to witness the chef's actual cooking and taping sessions plus treat them to a free taste of every dish that the chef concocts in the show. The truck is robotically programmed to self-assemble and disassemble with the press of a button and is loaded with a working kitchen and built-in audio and lighting equipment. It also carries its own power supply, which powers its robotic stage and roof assembly. Apart from "Turo Tours", several other segments were introduced like "Market Basket Challenge", "Cook-along" and "Master Fiesta Dish".

The fourth season introduced another segment called "Kusina Master for the Day". The segment featured a chef that is known for his or her own signature dish. This dish may be a masterpiece in his personal kitchen or a specialty in an establishment. The "Kusina Master for the Day" also shares his/her success story to inspire the viewers. Another segment was introduced, "Ininit to Eat it" (lit. Re-heat it to eat it) wherein Chef Boy Logro prepares new recipes from left-over food.

On the sixth season, the show launches another segment called "Kusina Master's Collegiate Cooking Challenge" wherein culinary students all over the country pitted against each other in a cooking match and other challenges.

Ratings
According to AGB Nielsen Philippines' Mega Manila People/Individual television ratings, the pilot episode of Chef Boy Logro: Kusina Master earned a 9.1% rating. While the final episode scored a 9.1% rating in Mega Manila household television ratings.

Accolades

References

External links
 

2012 Philippine television series debuts
2014 Philippine television series endings
Filipino-language television shows
GMA Network original programming
Philippine cooking television series